PICAP is a Catalan record label headquartered in Castellar del Vallès, Spain. It was founded in 1984.

History 

PICAP supports Catalan authors and performers. While respecting the performer's linguistic expression, it gives preferential support to the Catalan language.

Its debuted as a record label in 1984 with four maxi-singles that appeared simultaneously: the synthpop band Programa, Javier Asensi, pop group Oslo, and hard-rock artist Rockson.

, Maria-Josep Villarroya, Gato Pérez, and Joan Soler Boronat were among PICAP's first artists. The first commercial success of the new record label was Catalan humorist .

In the last years of the 1980s, the band Grec, a PICAP artist, joined in a wave of funk music similar to that of other new bands that were starting their careers in those days (such as Duble Buble and N'Gai N'Gai).

The band Sau, after the success achieved on PICAP with Quina nit, signed for a multinational record label. The band Sangtraït, however, stayed with PICAP and prepared its fourth album Contes i llegendes at a time when Catalan rock had reached its peak. Rock and "Cançó" became PICAP's main genres with notable artists in both genres.

In 1991, Lluís Llach joined the record label because of its prestige and trustworthiness, then established ties with Companyia Elèctrica Dharma, Tomeu Penya, Raimon, Maria del Mar Bonet, and Marina Rossell. In 1993, the record company received National Music Awards in Catalonia for their releases. In the late 1990s, the Valencian band Al Tall published with PICAP.

Artist roster

From the catalogues of Edigsa, PDI, and Als 4 vents 

 Josep Vicenç Foix
 Grau Carol
 Remei Margarit
 Josep Maria Espinàs
 Delfí Abella
 Salvador Escamilla
 Josep Carner
 Salvador Espriu
 Els 4 gats
 Orfeó Lleidatà
 Dodó Escolà
 Francesc Heredero
 Clementina Arderiu
 Marià Manent
 Antoni Ros Marbà
 Coral Sant Jordi
 Carles Riba
 Queta & Teo
 Francesc Pi de la Serra
 Els 4 Z
 Cobla Barcelona
 Catalonia Jazz Quartet
 Duo Ausona
 Maria Cinta
 Germanes Ros
 Picapedrers
 Els Xerracs
 Els Corbs
 Gil Vidal
 Mauné i els seus dinàmics
 Quartet vocal Clara Schumann
 L’esquitx
 Jovelyne Jocya
 Jacinta
 Jeannette Ramsay
 Joe Martin
 Orfeó Enric Morera
 Brenner’s folk
 Dos + un
 Núria Espert
 Miquelina Lladó
 Salomé
 Cor Madrigal
 Marian Albero
 Núria Feliu
 Pere Quart
 Joan Manuel Serrat
 Albert Vidal
 Isidor
 Eddie Lee Mattison
 Pere i Joan Francesc
 Maria Pilar
 Jordi Fàbregas
 Miró Casabella
 El grup de 3
 Elisa Serna
 Maria e Xavier
 Xoan Rubia
 Els Consellers
 Jaume Arnella
 Teresa Rebull
 Agustí Bartra
 Falsterbo 3
 Gualberto
 Quilapayún
 Guillermina Motta
 Maquina (person)
 Tapi
 Ara va de bo
 Enric Barbat
 Orquestra Simfònica de Barcelona
 Grup de folk
 Jei Noguerol
 Tapiman
 
 Jarka
 Vicent Torrent
 Jordi Soler
 Hamster
 Miquel Cors
 Guima & Shabbath
 Enric Barbat
 Peter Roar
 Esquirols
 Daniel Viglietti
 Dolors Laffitte
 Maria Laffitte
 Toti Soler
 Joan Baptista Humet
 Els Sapastres
 Orquestra Mirasol
 Jordi Sabatés
 Iceberg
 Barcelona Traction
 Ovidi Montllor
 Al Tall
 Quintín Cabrera
 Ramon Muntaner
 Blay Tritono
 Música Urbana
 Secta Sònica
 Companyia Elèctrica Dharma
 Francisco Curto
 Oriol Tramvia
 Mirasol Colores
 Rafael Subirachs
 Badabadoc
 Xesco Boix
 Colla Jacomet
 Josep Tarradellas
 Josiana
 Cobla Selvatana
 Jordi Farràs
 Aguaviva
 Jazzom
 La Alegre Banda
 Melodrama
 Doberman
 Los Auténticos
 Liquid Car
 Cathy
 Víctor Manuel Muñoz
 Canela
 Orquestra Català
 Lluís el Sifoner
 Alejandro Jean
 Lluciana Sari
 Sausalito
 Orquestra Pasapoga
 Huapacha Combo
 Pernil Latino
 Curroplastic
 Pegasus
 Teverano
 Suck Electrònic
 Carraixet
 Programa
 Julio Alberto y Carmen
 Tet i Àlex
 Tango?
 Santi Vendrell
 Cobla Mediterrània
 Burning
 Cobla Miramar
 Deneb
 Gato Pérez
 Astrolabio
 Orquestrina Galana
 Grup Gavina
 Orquestra Plateria
 Xavier Cugat
 El sac de danses
 Albert Pla
 Peret
 Ia Clua
 Jordi Batiste
 Los Sírex
 Lluís Llach
 Tete Montoliu
 Pere Tapias
 Esqueixada Sniff

From the catalogue of Picap 

 Rockson
 Oslo
 Hèctor Vila
 Programa
 Maria del Mar Bonet
 Grec
 La Madam
 La Murga
 Han
 Grup Terra Endins
 Maria-Josep Villarroya
 Quilapayún
 Manel Camp
 Tradivàrius
 Ambtainer
 Fuck off
 Disseny
 Max Sunyer
 Sangtraït
 Paco Muñoz
 Eugenio
 Sau
 Pixamandurries
 Tancat per defunció
 Josep Tero
 Manzano
 Parking
 Jaque al rey
 Ja t'ho diré
 Companyia Elèctrica Dharma
 Santi Arisa
 i-6
 Nakki
 Terratrèmol
 Tots sants
 Zoo il·lògics
 Orquestra Maravella
 Salzburg
 Fora des sembrat
 La Fosca
 Bitayna
 Marc Durandeau
 Quercus Suber
 Miquel del Roig
 Modest Moreno
 Gema 4
 Jose Angel Navarro
 Nats
 Rovell d’ou
 Arizona Baby
 Sui Generis
 Santi Arisa
 Port Bo
 Empordà Fusió
 Tomeu Penya
 Alius
 Tela Marinera
 Lliris
 Tralla
 Carles Cases
 El Cimarrón
 Marina Rossell
 Quars
 Pep Sala & La banda del bar
 Roger Mas
 La Rural Company
 Sílvia Comes
 Lídia Pujol
 Dyango
 Adirà Puntí
 Ramoncín
 Loquillo
 Pastora
 Mariona Comellas
 Mar Endins
 Bluestereo
 Los Amaya
 Cobla De Cambra de Catalunya
 Pa d’angel
 Xató
 The Companys
 Túrnez & Sesé
 Keympa
 Ginesa Ortega
 Rockness
 Inèdits
 Entregirats
 Muhel
 Victor Gioconda
 Naltrus
 Narcís Perich
 Outsider
 Inti Illimani
 Rafa Xambó
 Aljub
 Ramon Sauló

References

 Pujol, Carles. Picap 20 anys, del vinil al DVD. Picap, S.L. 2004, B-40.354-2004
 Google translation
 Google translation
 Google translation
 Google translation
 Google translation

Specific

External links 
 Official Web
 Facebook Picap
 Twitter Picap
 Youtube Picap

Catalan music
Record labels established in 1984
Spanish record labels
IFPI members